Conserving NRG is an album by American avant-garde jazz composer, bandleader, and multi-instrumentalist Hal Russell recorded in 1984 and released on the Principally Jazz label.

Reception

The AllMusic review by Scott Yanow states, "Russell explores seven diverse and consistently colorful group originals that are more accessible than expected. This highly expressive music (which has plenty of variety) is worth checking out".

Track listing
All compositions by Hal Russell except as indicated 
 "Rusty Nails" (Curt Bley) - 6:46  
 "Blue Over You" - 5:44  
 "OJN" - 5:32  
 "Pontiac" (Brian Sandstrom) - 4:09  
 "Sine Die" (Sandstrom) - 3:08  
 "Overbite" (Steve Hunt) - 9:08  
 "Song Singing to You" - 10:36
 "Swing Sting" - 11:29 Bonus track on CD 
 "Linda's Rock Vamp" - 3:28 Bonus track on CD

Personnel
Hal Russell - tenor saxophone, cornet, vibraphone, drums, percussion
Chuck Burdelik - tenor saxophone, alto saxophone, percussion
Brian Sandstrom - trumpet, guitar, bass, percussion
Curt Bley - bass
Steve Hunt—drums, vibraphone, percussion

References

Hal Russell albums
NRG Ensemble albums
1984 albums